Solon Irving Bailey (December 29, 1854 – June 5, 1931) was an American astronomer and discoverer of the main-belt asteroid 504 Cora, on June 30, 1902.

Bailey joined the staff of Harvard College Observatory in 1887. He received an M.A. from there in 1888 in addition to his previous M.A. from Boston University. After the observatory received the "Boyden Fund" bequest from the will of Uriah A. Boyden, Bailey played a major role in finding a site for Boyden Station in Arequipa, Peru, and was in charge of it from 1892 to 1919. He was also one of the first to carry out meteorological studies in Peru, traveling extensively in desolate areas at very high altitude. Boyden Station was moved to South Africa in 1927 due to better weather conditions and became known as the Boyden Observatory.

He made extensive studies of variable stars in globular clusters in the southern skies. He also performed a light-curve analysis measured the rotation period of the near-Earth asteroid 433 Eros during its 1903 opposition with great accuracy. Bailey was acting director of Harvard College Observatory from 1919 to 1921 after the death of Edward Charles Pickering and prior to the appointment of Harlow Shapley. He worked as a senior colleague with Henrietta Leavitt. He was elected a Fellow of the American Academy of Arts and Sciences in 1892. Irving died at his summer home in Hanover, New Hampshire, from an illness caused by heart disease, in 1931.

References

External links

Further reading 
 

1854 births
1931 deaths
19th-century American astronomers
20th-century American astronomers
Boston University alumni
Discoverers of asteroids
Fellows of the American Academy of Arts and Sciences
Harvard University alumni
Harvard University staff
People from Lisbon, New Hampshire
Harvard College Observatory people